The Economist Intelligence Unit’s where-to-be-born index (previously called the quality-of-life index, abbreviated QLI) attempts to measure which country will provide the best opportunities for a healthy, safe and prosperous life in the years ahead. It is based on a method that links the results of subjective life-satisfaction surveys to the objective determinants of quality of life across countries along with a onward-looking elements.

Methodology
The index calculated for 2013 includes data from 80 countries and territories. The survey used ten quality of life factors along with forecasts of future GDP per capita to determine a nation's score.

The life satisfaction scores for 2006 (on a scale of 1 to 10) for 130 countries (from the Gallup Poll) are related in a multivariate regression to various factors. As many as 11 indicators are statistically significant. Together these indicators explain some 85% of the inter-country variation in life satisfaction scores. The values of the life satisfaction scores that are predicted by the indicators represent a country's quality of life index. The coefficients in the estimated equation weight automatically the importance of the various factors. The estimated equation for 2006 can be utilized to calculate index values for year in the past and future, allowing for comparison over time as well across countries.

The independent variables in the estimating equation for 2006 include: 
Material well-being as measured by GDP per capita (in $, at 2006 constant PPPS)
Life expectancy at birth
The quality of family life based primarily on divorce rates
The state of political freedoms
Job security (measured by the unemployment rate)
Climate (measured by two variables: the average deviation of minimum and maximum monthly temperatures from 14 degrees Celsius; and the number of months in the year with less than 30mm rainfall)
Personal physical security ratings (based primarily on recorded homicide rates and ratings for risk from crime and terrorism)
Quality of community life (based on membership in social organizations)
Governance (measured by ratings for corruption)
Gender equality (measured by the share of women holding seats in national Houses of Assembly)

2013 rankings

1988 rankings
The original quality-of-life index was released in 1988. It included a "philistine factor" for a lack of culture and a "yawn index" which measured how boring a country might be despite all its other advantages.

See also

Measurement and metrics

Indices

Notes

 International quality of life rankings
 Economist Intelligence Unit